The Rescue Union School District is a public school district in El Dorado County, California, United States.  The district operates five elementary (K - 5) schools and two middle (6 - 8) schools. In the late 1980s the district began experiencing rapid growth in the student population due to areawide development; by 1990, when it consisted of four schools, it began to plan for serving an enlarged population.

Schools:

Lake Forest Elementary School
Lakeview Elementary School
Jackson Elementary School
Green Valley Elementary School
Rescue Elementary School
Marina Village Middle School
Pleasant Grove Middle School

See also
El Dorado Hills

References

External links
 

School districts in El Dorado County, California